Enter the Wu-Tang (36 Chambers) is the debut studio album by American hip hop group Wu-Tang Clan, released on November 9, 1993, by Loud Records. Recording sessions took place during late 1992 to early 1993 at Firehouse Studio in New York City, and the album was produced by the group's de facto leader RZA. Its title originates from the martial arts films Enter the Dragon (1973) and The 36th Chamber of Shaolin (1978).

The gritty, distinctive sound of Enter the Wu-Tang (36 Chambers) created a blueprint for hardcore hip hop during the 1990s, and helped return New York City hip hop to national prominence. Its sound also became greatly influential in modern hip hop production, while the group members' explicit, humorous, and free-associative lyrics have served as a template for many subsequent rap records. Serving as a landmark release in the era of hip hop known as the East Coast Renaissance, its influence helped lead the way for several other East Coast rappers, including Nas, The Notorious B.I.G., Mobb Deep, and Jay-Z.

Despite its raw, underground sound, the album had surprising chart success, peaking at number 41 on the US Billboard 200 chart, selling 30,000 copies in its first week on sale. By 1995, it was certified Platinum by the Recording Industry Association of America, and in October 2018 it was certified triple platinum. Initially receiving positive reviews from most music critics, Enter the Wu-Tang (36 Chambers) has since been widely regarded as one of the most significant albums of the 1990s, as well as one of the greatest hip hop albums of all time. In 2020, the album was ranked 27th on Rolling Stone's updated list of the 500 Greatest Albums of All Time. In 2022, the album was selected by the Library of Congress for preservation in the National Recording Registry for being "culturally, historically, or aesthetically significant".

Background 
In the late 1980s, cousins Robert Diggs, Gary Grice, and Russell Jones formed a group named Force of the Imperial Master, also known as the All in Together Now Crew. Each member recorded under an alias: Grice as The Genius, Diggs as Prince Rakeem or The Scientist, and Jones as The Specialist. The group never signed to a major label, but caught the attention of the New York City rap scene and was recognized by rapper Biz Markie. By 1991, The Genius and Prince Rakeem were signed to separate record labels. The Genius released Words from the Genius (1991) on Cold Chillin' Records and Prince Rakeem released Ooh I Love You Rakeem (1991) on Tommy Boy Records. Both were soon dropped by their labels. Embittered but unbowed, they refocused their efforts and on new monikers; The Genius became GZA (pronounced "jizza"), while Prince Rakeem became RZA (pronounced "rizza"). RZA discussed the matter in the book The Wu-Tang Manual (2005), stating "[Tommy Boy] made the decision to sign House of Pain over us. When they dropped me, I was thinking, 'Damn, they chose a bunch of whiteboy shit over me.'"

RZA began collaborating with Dennis Coles, later known as Ghostface Killah, another rapper from the Stapleton Houses in Staten Island. The duo decided to create a hip hop group whose ethos would be a blend of "Eastern philosophy picked up from kung fu movies, watered-down Five-Percent Nation preaching picked up on the New York streets, and comic books."

Recording and production 
Enter the Wu-Tang (36 Chambers) was recorded at Firehouse Studio in New York City. The album was produced, mixed, arranged, and programmed by RZA, and was mastered at The Hit Factory in New York City by Chris Gehringer. Because of an extremely limited budget, the group was only able to record in a small, inexpensive studio; with up to eight of the nine Wu-Tang members in the studio at once, the quarters were frequently crowded. To decide who appeared on each song, RZA forced the Wu-Tang rappers to battle with each other. This competition led to the track "Meth Vs. Chef", a battle between Method Man and Raekwon over the rights to rap over RZA's beat; this track was left off the Wu-Tang Clan's debut album but surfaced on Method Man's debut, Tical (1994).

Group leader RZA produced Enter the Wu-Tang (36 Chambers) by creating sonic collages from classic soul samples and clips from martial arts movies Shaolin and Wu Tang (1983) and Ten Tigers from Kwangtung (1979). He complemented the rappers' performances with "lean, menacing beats that evoked their gritty, urban surroundings more effectively than their words," according to Stephen Thomas Erlewine of Allmusic. The use of soul samples and various esoteric clips, and the technique by which RZA employed them in his beats was unique and largely unprecedented in hip hop. The gritty sound of Enter the Wu-Tang is due, at least in part, to the use of cheap equipment to produce the album.

Music and lyrics 

According to music journalist Ben Yew, the minimalist means of production plays directly into the music's "street" aesthetic. "Because [RZA] didn't have the best mixing or recording equipment, the album is wrought with a 'dirty' quality—the drums have more bass and are more hard-hitting than they are crisp and clean; the samples have an eerie, almost haunting type of echo; and the vocals, because each member's voice is already aggressive and gritty, perfectly match the production." Although Ol' Dirty Bastard is given co-production credit on "Da Mystery of Chessboxin'" and Method Man is co-credited for "Wu-Tang Clan Ain't Nuthing ta F' Wit", critics and admirers universally credit RZA with developing what Pitchfork called a "dusty yet digital production style [that] helped legitimize the use of more diverse sample sources to the hardcore New York rap massive, breaking away from James Brown based beats and embracing a style that turned the Underdog theme into the menacing coda for a group of underground terrorists."

Enter the Wu-Tang ushered in a new standard for hip hop at a time when hip hop music was dominated by the jazz-influenced styles of A Tribe Called Quest, the Afrocentric viewpoints of Public Enemy, and the rising popularity of West Coast gangsta rap. The album's explicit, humorous and free-associative lyrics have been credited for serving as a template for many subsequent hip hop records. Rolling Stone described the album as possessing an aesthetic that was "low on hype and production values [and] high on the idea that indigence is a central part of blackness". While the lyrical content on Enter the Wu-Tang generally varies from rapper to rapper, the basic themes are the same—urban life, martial arts movies, comic book references, and marijuana—and the setting is invariably the harsh environment of New York City. AllMusic contributor Steve Huey praises the lyricists for their originality and caustic humor, stating "Some were outsized, theatrical personalities, others were cerebral storytellers and lyrical technicians, but each had his own distinctive style ... Every track on Enter the Wu-Tang is packed with fresh, inventive rhymes, which are filled with martial arts metaphors, pop culture references (everything from Voltron to Lucky Charms cereal commercials to Barbra Streisand's "The Way We Were"), bizarre threats of violence, and a truly twisted sense of humor."

With the exception of "Method Man" and GZA's "Clan in da Front", every song features multiple rappers contributing verses of varying lengths. The verses are essentially battle rhymes, mixed with humor and outsized tales of urban violence and drug use. There is some debate about whether the lyrics on 36 Chambers are properly classified as gangsta rap or something else entirely. In a Stylus magazine review, writer Gavin Mueller evokes the bleakness of the Wu-Tang world view:

All nine original Wu-Tang Clan members contribute vocals on Enter the Wu-Tang. Masta Killa only appears on one track, contributing the last verse of "Da Mystery of Chessboxin,'" but all the other rappers appear on at least two songs. Method Man and Raekwon are the most prolific of the group, featured on eight tracks. Though the performers have widely differing techniques, the chemistry between them is a key ingredient of the album's success. Pitchfork asserts that "Half the charm is in the cast's idiosyncrasies: ODB's hovering sing-song, Raekwon's fake stutter, Ghostface's verbal tics, Method Man's hazy, dusted voice."

Title 
Part of the album's title originates from the Five Percent philosophy, known to adherents as the Supreme Mathematics, which attaches the number 9 with the meaning "to bring into existence". Because the Wu-Tang Clan was made of nine members, each of whom has four chambers of the heart, the album was subtitled "36 Chambers", being the total of the nine hearts of the members.

In reference to the 1978 kung fu film The 36th Chamber of Shaolin that the group enjoyed watching, the Clan considered themselves as lyrical masters of the 36 chambers, and arrived onto the rap scene while appearing to be ahead, and more advanced over others, with "knowledge of 36 chambers of hip hop music when everyone else in hip hop was striving to attain the knowledge of 35 lessons". Also, while the human body has 108 pressure points (1 + 0 + 8 = 9), only the Wu-Tang martial artists learned and understood that 36 of those pressure points are deadly (9 + 36 = 45) (4 + 5 = 9). The lyrics and rhymes of the 9 members are to be considered as 36 deadly lyrical techniques for pressure points. All of this is the basis for the album title, Enter the Wu-Tang (36 Chambers), being that 9 members x 4 chambers = 36. However, this is just a theory; the true significance of the title is not definitively known. The first part of the title is taken from the 1973 film Enter the Dragon and aforementioned Shaolin and Wu Tang.

Singles 

"Protect Ya Neck" and "Tearz" were the first tracks recorded by the Wu-Tang Clan, released independently by the group as a 12-inch single in December 1992. "Protect Ya Neck" is a free-associative and braggadocious battle rap featuring eight of the nine Wu-Tang Clan members. The track was also edited to scratch out all profanity, save for repeated use of the word "nigga". An uncensored version known as the "Bloody Version" was released on the 2004 compilation album, Legend of the Wu-Tang Clan. "Tearz" tells two stories: RZA's little brother getting shot and Ghostface Killah recounting the story of a man who contracts HIV after having unprotected sex. The singles were independently released as, "Protect Ya Neck"/"After the Laughter Comes Tears", which RZA financed by demanding $100 (USD) from each rapper who wanted a verse on the A-side. The single was re-released in a much larger pressing, with "Method Man" as the B-side.

"C.R.E.A.M.", featuring Raekwon and Inspectah Deck, was the second single from the album, and the first new A-side to be released after the group signed with Loud/RCA. The lyrics deal with the struggle of poverty, and the desire to earn money by any means. It was the Wu-Tang Clan's most successful single, reaching number 60 on the Billboard Hot 100 and number 8 on the Billboard Hot Rap Tracks chart. The single topped the Hot Dance Music/Maxi-Singles Sales chart. Wu-Tang's "Can It Be All So Simple", featuring Ghostface Killah and Raekwon, was the album's third single. The single failed to chart on the Billboard Hot 100 but reached number 24 on the Hot Rap Tracks chart in 1994. A remix of the song was included on Raekwon's debut solo album, Only Built 4 Cuban Linx... (1995).

Wu-Tang made music videos for the three A-sides and the B-side songs including "Method Man", "Da Mystery of Chessboxin'", and "Wu-Tang Clan Ain't Nuthing ta Fuck Wit". As the group's profile increased, the quality of their videos improved; though the "Protect Ya Neck" video resembled a home movie, later videos were directed by rising hip hop music video director Hype Williams. The videos received almost no airplay on MTV but were extremely popular on video-by-request channels such as The Box. Touré wrote in his 1993 Rolling Stone review that, "in Brooklyn, N.Y., right now and extending back a few months, the reigning fave is the Wu-Tang Clan, who are to the channel what Guns N' Roses are to MTV."

Critical reception 

Enter the Wu-Tang (36 Chambers) was received positively by contemporary critics. In an article for The Source, The Ghetto Communicator wrote "This record is harsh, but so is the world that we live in. For B-boys n'girls who come from the core of the hard, this is the hip-hop album you've been waiting for". Entertainment Weekly said, "With its rumble jumble of drumbeats, peppered with occasional piano plunking, Enter has a raw, pass-the-mike flavor we haven't heard since rap was pop's best-kept secret." Touré was less enthusiastic in Rolling Stone, praising the album's sound, but noting that "Wu-Tang ... are more ciphers than masterful creations. In refusing to commodify themselves, they leave blank the ultimate canvas—the self." He added, "This is hip-hop you won't find creeping up the Billboard charts but you will hear booming out of Jeep stereos in all the right neighborhoods." However, Enter the Wu-Tang had surprising chart success, despite its raw, underground sound. It peaked at number 41 on the Billboard 200 chart and reached number eight on Billboards Top R&B/Hip-Hop Albums chart. The album continued to sell steadily and was eventually certified platinum by the Recording Industry Association of America on May 15, 1995.

Over time, Enter the Wu-Tang became one of the most highly regarded albums in hip hop. The album was originally given a rating of 4.5 mics out of 5 in The Source magazine in 1994; however, it was given a classic 5 mic rating in a later issue of the magazine. Similar to The Source, XXL magazine gave the album a classic rating of "XXL" in its retrospective 2007 issue. In the book Spin Alternative Record Guide (1995), Enter the Wu-Tang (36 Chambers) has a critical rating of 8/10 from Spin. In 2003, Rolling Stone named the album among the "500 Greatest Albums of All Time", asserting that "East-coast hip-hop made a return in 1993." The magazine later listed it as one of the "Essential Albums of the 90s" and "100 Best Debut Albums of All Time." The Source cited Enter the Wu-Tang as one of the "100 Best Rap Albums", while also naming "Protect Ya Neck/Method Man" and "C.R.E.A.M." among the "100 Best Rap Singles". MTV declared it among "The Greatest Hip-Hop Albums of All Time", while Blender named the album among the "500 CDs You Must Own". Oliver Wang, author of Classic Material: The Hip-Hop Album Guide described it "as timeless an album as hip-hop has ever seen."

Publications based outside of the United States have acclaimed 36 Chambers as well; Australia's Juice magazine placed it at number 40 on its list of "100 Greatest Albums of the '90s", and Les Inrockuptibles ranked it number 59 on a list of "The 100 Best Albums 1986–1996". In naming Enter the Wu-Tang one of the 50 best albums of the 1990s, Pitchfork Media staff member Rollie Pemberton summed up the album's critical recognition by writing:

In a retrospective review, Robert Christgau found the Wu-Tang Clan "grander" and "goofier" than their West Coast contemporaries and concluded, "Expect the masterwork this album's reputation suggests and you'll probably be disappointed—it will speak directly only to indigenous hip hoppers. Expect a glorious human mess, as opposed to the ominous platinum product of their opposite numbers, and you'll realize the dope game isn't everyone's dead-end street". In 2010, Enter the Wu-Tang (36 Chambers) was included in the book 1001 Albums You Must Hear Before You Die.

Legacy and influence

East Coast hip hop 
 
Adam Heimlich of the New York Press considers the album a touchstone of hardcore hip hop, a gritty, stripped-down, dark and violent subgenre of hip hop and the signature sound of New York City's rap scene during the mid-1990s. He writes that "the Wu-Tang Clan ... all but invented 90s New York rap, back when the notion of an East Coast gangsta still meant Schoolly D or Kool G. Rap ... [They] designed the manner and style in which New York artists would address what Snoop and Dre had made rap's hottest topics: drugs and violence." As the album helped return New York City hip hop to national prominence, a new generation of New York rappers, many of them inspired by the Wu-Tang Clan's example, released a flurry of classic albums that later became known as the East Coast Renaissance. Enter the Wu-Tang has been recognized by critics as a landmark album in the movement. AllMusic indicates that the success of the album paved the way for Nas, The Notorious B.I.G., Mobb Deep, and Jay-Z.

At the time of the album's release, mainstream hip hop was dominated by the West Coast. Enter the Wu-Tang (along with Nas' critically acclaimed Illmatic and the commercial success of The Notorious B.I.G.'s Ready to Die) was able to shift the emphasis away from the melodious, synthesizer-driven G-funk and restore interest into the East Coast hip hop scene. According to one columnist, "When Enter the Wu-Tang: The 36 Chambers first graced the pages of rap lore in 1993, Dr. Dre's funk-filled, West Coast gangster rap dominated the business. Though this initial dominance was difficult to overcome, Wu-Tang still managed to carve out a piece of rap history."

Hip hop production 
RZA's production on Enter the Wu-Tang had a profound and significant influence on subsequent hip hop producers. The distinctive sound of Enter the Wu-Tang has been credited with creating a blueprint for hardcore hip hop in the mid-1990s. Blackfilm.com asserts that Enter the Wu-Tang'''s production formula "transformed the sound of underground rap into mainstream formula, and virtually changed the face of contemporary music as popsters once knew it." Many successful rap producers have admitted to the influence of RZA's beats on their own production efforts. 9th Wonder, a producer and former member of Little Brother, is one of many whose vocal sampling styles are inspired by RZA. The album's reliance on soul music samples was novel at the time, but 21st-century producers such as The Alchemist, Kanye West, and Just Blaze now rely on this technique. According to Allmusic, the production on two Mobb Deep albums, The Infamous (1995) and Hell on Earth (1996), are "indebted" to RZA's early production with Wu-Tang Clan. In addition, the soul singer Bilal names it among his 25 favorite albums, citing its creative approach and "energy" of the contributors.

 Subsequent Wu-Tang work 
Following Enter the Wu-Tangs success, the individual members of the group negotiated and signed solo contracts with a variety of different labels: Method Man signed with Def Jam, Ol' Dirty Bastard with Elektra, GZA with Geffen Records, and Ghostface Killah with Epic Records. This expansion across the music industry was an element of RZA's stated plan for industry-wide domination, wherein "All Wu releases are deemed to be 50 percent partnerships with Wu-Tang Productions and each Wu member with solo deal must contribute 20 percent of their earnings back to Wu-Tang Productions, a fund for all Wu members".

On Enter the Wu-Tangs effect on the group and the music industry, the Milwaukee Journals Aaron Justin-Szopinski wrote "The Wu showed us that a hip-hop group can control its own destiny in the tangled web of the industry. It owns publishing rights, controls its samples and has 90% influence over its career. And that control, that outlook for the future, is what makes it the best." Wu-Tang Clan have released seven subsequent group albums since Enter the Wu-Tang, including Wu-Tang Forever (1997), which is certified as a quadruple platinum record. None of the subsequent Wu-Tang Clan albums have garnered the critical accolades that their debut was accorded.

In 2013, the group reunited, at the behest of RZA, for an album and tour celebrating the 20th anniversary of the albums release. The album was titled A Better Tomorrow and the tour included dates throughout the United States, Europe, and Russia. All original members of the group who performed on Enter the Wu-Tang participated in both the tour and reunion album, excepting Ol' Dirty Bastard, who died in 2004.

 Accolades 
The information regarding accolades attributed to Enter the Wu-Tang is taken from AcclaimedMusic.net, except for lists with additional sources.
( * ) designates lists that are unordered.

In 2022 the recording was added to the National Recording Registry for preservation by the Library of Congress.

 Track listing 

 CD 
 Tracks 1–5 are on the Shaolin Sword side of the album and tracks 6–12 are on the Wu-Tang Sword side.

In international releases, "Method Man (Skunk Mix)" is added as Track 13 with "Conclusion" being Track 14. An Expanded Edition of the album available on digital platforms like Amazon Music and Spotify contains three additional tracks: a "Shao lin" version of "Protect Ya Neck", a "Home Grown" version of "Method Man", and an a cappella version of "C.R.E.A.M.".

 Vinyl/Cassette 
The vinyl and cassette track order is slightly different from the CD:

International cassette version

 Personnel 
Credits adapted from AllMusic.

 Musicians 
 Inspectah Deck – vocals, lyrics
 4th Disciple – scratching
 Ghostface Killah – executive producer, vocals, lyrics
 GZA/Genius – vocals, lyrics
 Masta Killa – vocals, lyrics
 Method Man – vocals, producer, lyrics
 Ol' Dirty Bastard – vocals, producer, lyrics
 RZA/Prince Rakeem – arranger, executive producer, mixing, producer, programming, vocals, lyrics
 Raekwon – vocals, lyrics
 U-God – vocals, lyrics

 Additional personnel 
 Carlos Bess – engineer
 Richard Bravo – set design, design
 Mitchell Diggs – executive producer, supervisor, production supervisor
 Chris Gehringer – mastering
 John Gibbons – supervisor, production supervisor
 Oli Grant – executive producer, supervisor, production supervisor
 Daniel Hastings – photography
 Michael McDonald – supervisor, production supervisor
 Jacqueline Murphy – artwork, art direction
 Ethan Ryman – engineer
 Theodore "Tareef" Michael – supervisor, production supervisor
 Tracey Waples – executive producer
 Amy Wenzler – design

 Charts 

 Weekly charts 

 Year-end charts 

Certifications

 See also 
 Album era

 Notes 

 References 

 
 
 
 

 External links 
 Enter the Wu-Tang (36 Chambers)'' at Discogs
 RapReviews: Back to the Lab — by Steve Juon

1993 debut albums
Albums produced by RZA
Loud Records albums
RCA Records albums
Wu-Tang Clan albums
United States National Recording Registry recordings
United States National Recording Registry albums